The 1999 Belgian Open doubles was the doubles event of the sixth edition of the Belgian Open; a WTA Tier IV tournament and the most prestigious women's tennis tournament held in Belgium on clay. The tournament had not occurred since 1993, when it was won by Radka Bobková and María José Gaidano. They did not compete this year.

Laura Golarsa and Katarina Srebotnik won the tournament without losing a set, defeating Louise Pleming and Meghann Shaughnessy in the final.

Seeds

Draw

Qualifying

Seeds

Qualifiers
  Jane Chi /  Meilen Tu

Lucky losers
  Kim Clijsters /  Nirupama Vaidyanathan

Qualifying draw

External links
 ITF tournament profile
 Main draw (WTA)

Belgian Open (tennis)
Flanders Women's Open